Jacobus Ferdinand 'Cabous' van der Westhuizen  (born 11 January 1965) is a former South African rugby player. He never played in a test match, but played for South Africa in 11 tour matches.

Rugby career
After finishing school, Van der Westhuizen enrolled at Stellenbosch University for a degree in physical education and played for the Maties rugby team. He however injured his knee ligaments and after his rehabilitation, while playing for  against , was spotted by the Natal coach, Ian McIntosh, who persuaded him to move to Natal, where he spent seven seasons.

With his retirement from rugby, Van der Westhuizen held the Natal record for most tries in a career, namely 90 in 128 games, as well as most tries in a season, with 28 during the 1993 season.

Van der Westhuizen toured with the Springboks to New Zealand in 1994 and at the end of 1994 to Britain and Ireland, playing in 11 tour matches and scoring two tries for South Africa.

See also
List of South Africa national rugby union players – Springbok no. 609

References

1965 births
Living people
South African rugby union players
South Africa international rugby union players
Golden Lions players
Western Province (rugby union) players
Sharks (Currie Cup) players
Alumni of Hoërskool Jan van Riebeeck
Rugby union players from Cape Town
Rugby union wings